Christopher Paus may refer to

Christopher de Paus, Norwegian papal chamberlain, count and philanthropist
Christopher Paus (businessman), Norwegian businessman in the shipping and offshore industries
Christopher Blom Paus, Norwegian ship-owner and uncle of Henrik Ibsen
Christopher Lintrup Paus, British diplomat